The Ganges river dolphin (Platanista gangetica) is a species of toothed whale classified in the family Platanistidae. It lives in the Ganges and related rivers of South Asia, namely in the countries of India, Nepal, and Bangladesh. It is related to the much smaller Indus river dolphin which lives in the Indus River in Pakistan and the Beas River of northwestern India.

It is also known by the name susu (popular name) or "Sisu" (Assamese language) and shushuk (Bengali). The Ganges river dolphin has been recognized by the Government of India as its National Aquatic Animal and is the official animal of the Indian city of Guwahati. Its first occurrence, within the Hooghly River, was documented by William Roxburgh.

Taxonomy
The Ganges river dolphin split from the Indus river dolphin during the Pleistocene, around 550,000 years ago. The earliest fossil identified as belonging to the species is only 12,000 years old.

The Ganges river dolphin was formally classified as Delphinus gangeticus two separate times in 1801, by Heinrich Julius Lebeck and William Roxburgh. They both likely used the type specimen, caught near Calcutta in late 1797 and sent to the Hunterian Museum in London. It may have been destroyed during World War II, but castings were previously made of the rostrum and parts of the lower jaw, which survive at the Natural History Museum. Whether Lebeck or Roxburgh should be given credit has been debated over the centuries, but research by Kinze (2000) found that Lebeck's  description was published on the 24 August while Roxburgh's was likely published no earlier than September, thus giving Lebeck the priority. Elisha Gray coined the species name  Platanista gangetica in 1835.

This species and the Indus river dolphin, were initially classified as a single species, Platanista gangetica, but in the 1970s both were split into distinct species. However, in the 1990s, both species were again grouped as a single species. However, more recent studies of genes, divergence time, and skull structure support both being distinct species.

Etymology 
The species has multiple common names throughout its range. It is known as susu as a popular name; soons, soans, or soos in Hindi; shushuk in Bengali; hiho or hihu in Assamese; bhagirath (as a reference to the character of the same name from Hindu mythology); and shus or suongsu in Nepali. Its Sanskrit name in medieval times was likely shishumar, and during the Mughal era, it was known as pani suar.

Distribution 
It lives along the Ganges-Brahmaputra-Meghna and Karnaphuli-Sangu river systems of Bangladesh and India, and the Sapta Koshi and Karnali Rivers in Nepal. The Ganges river dolphin favours deep pools, eddy countercurrents located downstream of the convergence of rivers and of sharp meanders, and upstream and downstream of midchannel islands.

Description 
The Ganges river dolphin has a rectangular, ridgelike dorsal fin and females tend to be larger than males. Ganges river dolphins usually are tan, chocolate brown, dark grey or light blue. They have an elongated, slender snout with sharp and very pointed teeth, similar to most river dolphins. The river dolphin has a rounded belly which, combined with their rectangular dorsal fin, makes them look particularly stocky in build compared to other dolphins. Their flippers and tail flukes are large and broad. They have a large melon head used for echolocation, because they cannot see well. Their eyes are usually small due to the cloudy water. Ganges river dolphins are usually 2.2-2.6 meters long (7–8 ft). The oldest recorded animal was a 28-year-old male, 199 cm in length, although they are estimated to live up to 30 years old.

Behavior

The Ganges river dolphins usually swim alone or in pairs and are not known to do acrobatic maneuvers near boats. Little is known about their behavior because they are usually shy around boats and are hard to observe. They are known to breach; however this is rare.

Vocalization 
This species shows object-avoidance behavior in both the consistently heavily murky waters of its habitat and in clear water in captivity, suggesting it is capable of using echolocation effectively to navigate and forage for prey. Information is limited on how extensively vocalization is used between individuals. It is capable of performing whistles, but rarely does so, suggesting that the whistle is a spontaneous sound and not a form of communication. The Ganges river dolphin most typically makes echolocation sounds such as clicks, bursts, and twitters. Produced pulse trains are similar in wave form and frequency to the echolocation patterns of the Amazon river dolphin. Both species regularly produce frequencies lower than 15 kHz and the maximum frequency is thought to fall  between 15 and 60 kHz.

Echolocation is also used for population counts by using acoustic surveying. This method is still being developed and is not heavily used due to cost and technical skill requirement. Given the dolphin's blindness, it produces an ultrasonic sound that is echoed off other fish and water species, allowing it to identify prey.

Reproduction
The dolphin does not have a specific mating season. When a calf is born, 8–12 months after conception, it will stay with its mother for one year.

Diet 
Ganges river dolphins use echolocation to find food. They eat crustaceans such as prawns and fish including carp, mahseer, and even sharks such as the Ganges shark (Glyphis gangeticus). They may also take birds and turtles.

Human interaction 
The Ganges River dolphin has been listed as endangered under the IUCN Red List since 1996. Human activity has played a large role in the reduction of both their native range and population size. The Ganges river dolphin and other freshwater dolphin species have faced declines in population from stressors such as noise pollution, ship traffic, and fishery bycatch. Anthropogenic activity like dam construction and hydroelectric power plants also contribute to their endangered status. They are also endangered due to pollution and overfishing for oil. Entanglement in fishing nets as bycatch can cause significant damage to local populations, and individuals are taken each year by hunters; their oil and meat are used as a liniment, as an aphrodisiac, and as bait for catfish. Poisoning of the water supply from industrial and agricultural chemicals may also have been a contributing factor towards population decline, as these chemicals are biomagnified in the bodies of the dolphins. An immediate danger for the species in National Chambal Sanctuary is the decrease in river depth and appearance of sand bars dividing the river course into smaller segments, as irrigation has lowered water levels throughout their range.

Mythology and folklore 
The Ganges dolphin is associated with Ganga and is occasionally the depiction of her vahana, the makara.

Conservation 
A 2017 population assessment estimated that less than 3,500 individuals of Platanista gangetica exist throughout the species' range. The underlying surveys are temporally patchy and believed to contain uncertainty.

The Ministry of Environment and Forest declared the Gangetic dolphin the national aquatic animal of India. A stretch of the Ganges River between Sultanganj and Kahlgaon in Bihar has been declared a dolphin sanctuary and named Vikramshila Gangetic Dolphin Sanctuary, the first such protected area.

The Uttar Pradesh government in India is propagating ancient Hindu texts in hopes of raising the community support to save the dolphins from disappearing. One of the lines being versed from Valimiki's Ramayan, highlighted the force by which the Ganges emerged from Lord Shivji's locks and along with this force came many species such as animals, fish, and the Shishumaar—the dolphin.

On 31 December 2020, a dead adult dolphin was found at the Sharda canal in the Pratapgarh district in India. A video circulated on social media showing a dozen men beating the dolphin with sticks and an ax. On 7 January 2021, three people were arrested.

The species is protected from international trade by its listing in Appendix I of the Convention on International Trade in Endangered Species of Wild Fauna and Flora. This makes commercial international trade prohibited.

Bangladesh has established six sanctuaries in the Sundarbans.

Nonhuman personhood 
On 20 May 2013, India's Ministry of Environment and Forests declared dolphins ‘nonhuman persons’ and as such has forbidden their captivity for entertainment purposes; keeping dolphins in captivity must satisfy certain legal prerequisites.

Project Dolphin 

On the occasion of the 74th Independence Day, 15 August 2020, the Indian Ministry of Environment, Forest and Climate Change announced 'Project Dolphin' to boost conservation of both river and oceanic dolphins.

References

External links 
 

River dolphins
Mammals of India
Mammals of Nepal
Mammals of Bangladesh
Mammals described in 1801
EDGE species
National symbols of India